The Ten Mile Hill Beds is a geologic formation in South Carolina. It preserves fossils.

See also

 List of fossiliferous stratigraphic units in South Carolina
 Paleontology in South Carolina

References
 

Geologic formations of South Carolina